Mátyás Sáfrán (born January 23, 1986 in Székesfehérvár) is a Hungarian sprint canoeist who has competed since 2007. He won a bronze medal in the C-4 1000 m event at the 2007 ICF Canoe Sprint World Championships in Duisburg.

Sáfrán was also eliminated in the semifinals of the C-2 500 m event at the 2008 Summer Olympics in Beijing.

References

1986 births
Living people
Sportspeople from Székesfehérvár
Hungarian male canoeists
Olympic canoeists of Hungary
Canoeists at the 2008 Summer Olympics
ICF Canoe Sprint World Championships medalists in Canadian
21st-century Hungarian people